William B. Little (birth unknown – death unknown) was an English professional rugby league footballer who played in the 1900s and 1910s.

Background
Billy Little was born in Cumberland, England.

Playing career

International honours
Billy Little won a cap for England while at Halifax in 1904 against Other Nationalities.

County Honours
Billy Little won caps for Cumberland and Yorkshire while at Halifax.

Challenge Cup Final appearances
Billy Little played  in Halifax's 7-0 victory over Salford in the 1902–03 Challenge Cup Final during the 1902–03 season at Headingley Rugby Stadium, Leeds on Saturday 25 April 1903, in front of a crowd of 32,507, and he played  in the 8-3 victory over Warrington in the 1903–04 Challenge Cup Final during the 1903–04 season at The Willows, Salford on Saturday 30 April 1904, in front of a crowd of 17,041.

County Cup Final appearances
Billy Little played  in Halifax's 3-13 defeat by Hunslet in the 1905–06 Yorkshire County Cup Final during the 1905–06 season at Park Avenue, Bradford on Saturday 2 December 1905, in front of a crowd of 18,500.

Club career
Billy Little made his début for Halifax on Saturday 21 September 1901, and he played his last match for Halifax on Monday 28 March 1910.

Honoured at Halifax
Billy Little is a Halifax Hall Of Fame Inductee.

References

External links

Cumberland rugby league team players
England national rugby league team players
English rugby league players
Halifax R.L.F.C. players
Place of birth missing
Place of death missing
Rugby league fullbacks
Rugby league players from Cumbria
Year of birth missing
Year of death missing
Yorkshire rugby league team players